The Charlottes were a female fronted indie pop band from Huntingdon, Cambridgeshire in England, formed in 1988.

History
The band formed in 1988, initially as The Giant Polar Bears, comprising Petra Roddis (vocals), Graham Gargiulo (guitar), David Fletcher (bass), and Simon Scott (drums). After a debut single "Are You Happy Now?" in 1988, their debut album, Love Happy, was issued by The Subway Organization the following year.

They were a favourite band of John Peel, for whom they recorded a radio session in 1989.

The band then signed to the Cherry Red label. In 1990, drummer Simon Scott left to join Slowdive and the band split up after releasing a second album, Things Come Apart, in 1990 and now records as a solo artist. Gargiulo later formed a new band, Barefoot Contessa.

Discography

Singles and EP
"Are You Happy Now?" (1988) Molesworth
Love in the Emptiness EP (1990) Subway
"Liar" (1990) Cherry Red

Albums
Love Happy (1989) Subway
Things Come Apart (1991) Cherry Red
Liar: The Best Of The Charlottes (2006) Cherry Red

References

British indie pop groups
Cherry Red Records artists